This is a list of cemeteries in Georgia.

 Didube Pantheon
 Khojivank Pantheon of Tbilisi
 Mtatsminda Pantheon
 Saburtalo Pantheon
 Vera cemetery

See also 
 Burials in Georgia (country)

References 

Georgia (country)
 
Cemeteries